Paul Jennings (born 22 September 1976) is an English former darts player who competed in British Darts Organisation (BDO) events.

Career

A native of Hartlepool in the north-east of the country, Jennings came to wider attention when he qualified for the 2012 BDO World Darts Championship. After defeating Garry Thompson 3-1 in the first round, Jennings defeated Steve Douglas 4-2 in their second round clash. He lost to fellow tournament debutant Wesley Harms in the quarter-finals, being defeated 5-3 in sets.

Despite a difficult 2012 season, Jennings once again qualified for the BDO World Championship in 2013. His first round opponent was sixth seed Ross Montgomery. Montgomery was in control of the match when Jennings hit a 144 checkout to save the third set, followed by a 102 checkout to win it. Jennings proceeded to win the match 3-1. In the second round, Jennings continued his fine finishing with a comprehensive 4-0 victory over Jason Cullen. Jennings then played eventual champion Scott Waites in the quarter-finals, where he trailed 4-0 but won back two sets before eventually being defeated 5-2.

He has not participated in any event since September 2016.

World Championship results

BDO

 2012: Quarter-finals (lost to Wesley Harms 3-5)
 2013: Quarter-finals (lost to Scott Waites 2-5)
 2014: 1st round (lost to Wesley Harms 0-3)
 2015: 1st round (lost to Darryl Fitton 0-3)

Performance timeline

References

1976 births
English darts players
Living people
Sportspeople from Hartlepool
British Darts Organisation players